German Jordanian University (GJU) is a public university located near Madaba, Jordan. It offers more than 20 programs to over 6,000 students, primarily from Jordan and the Middle East. The curriculum differs from other Jordanian universities, with German language courses offered as preparation for the fourth academic year at a university of applied sciences in Germany and an introduction to German industry through an obligatory internship within the framework of the study program. Ala’aldeen Al-Halhouli  was appointed president of the university in 2021, after being its vice-president from 2013 to 2017.

History 
GJU was founded on April 25, 2005, by royal decree, in accordance with a memorandum of understanding between the Ministry of Higher Education and Scientific Research of the Hashemite Kingdom of Jordan and the Federal Ministry of Education and Research of the Federal Republic of Germany. In August 2004 a founding committee, in close cooperation with Jordan's Ministry of Higher Education and Scientific Research, began its activities in Jordan. The university's programs are designed to encourage the training of young professionals to move back and forth between Europe and the Middle East.

Financial support 
GJU receives funding from the German government (namely the Bundesministerium für Bildung und Forschung, the German Federal Ministry of Education and Research), with additional contributions from the State of Saxony-Anhalt and the Magdeburg-Stendal University of Applied Sciences, Germany.

German Fachhochschulen (universities of applied sciences) model 

In cooperation with the Magdeburg-Stendal University of Applied Sciences, the project team joined about 70 German universities of applied sciences into a consortium. Its members design the study programs' curricula, recruit qualified German academic staff and host German students during their year. The consortium is open to additional German-language universities of applied sciences.

The five-year study programs at GJU will follow the model of the German Fachhochschulen (universities of applied sciences), with their philosophy of industry-based practice and an application-oriented approach to knowledge. A large percentage of German professors comprise the academic staff, and courses in German and English as a foreign language are offered to encourage fluency. After an initial phase in English, program courses are taught predominantly in German. Regional studies and cross-cultural communication are also part of the curriculum.

All the students spend 1 year in Germany, 50% within a partner university, 50% within a company.

Future plans
Plans for a new campus in Madaba, designed to help people with special needs, are underway. When complete, the Madaba campus will accommodate 5,000 students.

Notable alumni
 Maha Ali, current Jordanian Minister of Industry, Trade and Supply.

References

References
 Official website

Educational institutions established in 2005
Education in Amman
German Jordanian University
2005 establishments in Jordan
GJU